Austrogomphus praeruptus, also known as Austrogomphus (Austroepigomphus) praeruptus, is a species of dragonfly in the family Gomphidae, 
It inhabits slow streams, rivers and ponds in eastern Australia.

Austrogomphus praeruptus is a medium-sized, black and yellow dragonfly.

Gallery

Note
The taxonomic status of Austrogomphus praeruptus and Austrogomphus melaleucae is uncertain. The type specimen originally used to describe Austrogomphus praeruptus is now lost. It is probable that all dragonflies identified as Austrogomphus praeruptus may be Austrogomphus melaleucae if found north of the Victorian border.

See also
 List of Odonata species of Australia

References

Gomphidae
Odonata of Australia
Insects of Australia
Endemic fauna of Australia
Taxa named by Edmond de Sélys Longchamps
Insects described in 1857
Taxobox binomials not recognized by IUCN